The Women's trampoline competition at the 2016 Summer Olympics was held on 12 August, at the Arena Olímpica do Rio, Rio de Janeiro, Brazil.

Competition format

The competition had rounds: qualification and final. In qualification, the gymnasts performed two routines: compulsory and voluntary. Scores for the two were summed, and the best eight gymnasts moved on to the final. The final consisted of a single routine, with qualification scores not carrying over.

Schedule
All times are local (UTC−3)

Results

Qualification

Final

References

trampoline
2016
2016 in women's gymnastics
Women's events at the 2016 Summer Olympics